Oleksandr Mikolayovich Fedorov (born 12 April 1978), is a Ukrainian retired professional ice hockey player. He played for multiple teams during a career that lasted from 1994 until 2014. He also played internationally for the Ukrainian national team at the 2007 World Championship, while being named to the national team for other World Championships, as well as the 2002 Winter Olympics, though he did not play.

External links
 

1978 births
Living people
HC Berkut players
HC Berkut-Kyiv players
HK Gomel players
HK Liepājas Metalurgs players
HK Mogilev players
HK Neman Grodno players
HK Vitebsk players
Kompanion Kiev players
Sokil Kyiv players
Sportspeople from Kyiv
Ukrainian ice hockey goaltenders
Ice hockey players at the 2002 Winter Olympics
Olympic ice hockey players of Ukraine